Kelly Branch is a stream in Crawford County in the U.S. state of Missouri. It is a tributary of the Meramec River.

Kelly Branch has the name of an early settler.

See also
List of rivers of Missouri

References

Rivers of Crawford County, Missouri
Rivers of Missouri